Shane Vieau is a Canadian set decorator best known for his work on the 2017 film, The Shape of Water, for which he won an Academy Award for Best Production Design, with production designer, Paul Denham Austerberry and set decorator Jeff Melvin. He was also nominated for an Academy Award at the 94th Academy Awards for the film Nightmare Alley, for which his nomination is shared with Tamara Deverell in the category Best Production Design.

References

External links 
 

Living people
Best Art Direction Academy Award winners
Best Production Design BAFTA Award winners
Canadian production designers
Year of birth missing (living people)